Kelid was a non-partisan Persian language newspaper established in 2013. It was banned in November 2021 by government council for monitoring publication (composed of a justice of Iranian judiciary and Ministry of Islamic Culture and Guidance, Supreme Council of the Cultural Revolution, and Qom Seminary memberships). According to foreign and domestic press it was banned for hinting criticizing the Supreme leader for millions of Iranians being under poverty line using a photo of bloody hand of  Ali Khamenei in frontpage. owners were charged.

See also
Kayhan London
Installation art

Sources

2013 establishments in Iran
2021 disestablishments in Iran
Banned newspapers
Censorship in Iran
Defunct newspapers published in Iran
Persian-language newspapers
Newspapers established in 2013
Publications disestablished in 2021